30 Days is a 2006 Nigerian action thriller film written and directed by Mildred Okwo. The film received 8 nominations at the 2008 Africa Movie Academy Awards, with Joke Silva taking the award for Best Supporting Actress.

Cast
Genevieve Nnaji as Chinora Onu
Joke Silva as Dupe Ajayi
Segun Arinze as Inspector Shobowale

Ntalo Okorie 
Chet Anekwe as Kene Alumona
Najite Dede as Temilola brisbee
Kalu Ikeagwu as Jerry Ehime
Nobert Young as Pastor Hart
Ebele Okaro-Onyiuke as Mama Alero
Ekwi Onwuemene as Faye Dako
Gbenga Richards as Mr. President

Synopsis

In a country where assassination and corruption takes places, a young man found a lady at a club whom he falls in love with. However the lady is one of the group of assassins that murder corrupt government officials in the country.

See also
 List of Nigerian films of 2006

References

External links
 

2006 films
2006 action thriller films
Nigerian action thriller films
English-language Nigerian films
2000s English-language films